Theodor "Theo" Kleine (4 September 1924 – 12 February 2014) was a German sprint canoer who competed in the late 1950s. He won a silver medal in the K-2 10000 m  at the 1956 Summer Olympics in Melbourne.

Kleine also won two gold medals at the 1958 ICF Canoe Sprint World Championships in Prague, earning them in the K-4 1000 m and the K-4 10000 m events.

References

1924 births
2014 deaths
German male canoeists
Olympic canoeists of the United Team of Germany
Olympic silver medalists for the United Team of Germany
Olympic medalists in canoeing
Medalists at the 1956 Summer Olympics
Canoeists at the 1956 Summer Olympics
ICF Canoe Sprint World Championships medalists in kayak